John E. Horne (March 4, 1908 – January 8, 1985) was an American political strategist who served as Administrator of the Small Business Administration from 1961 to 1963.

References

1908 births
1985 deaths
Administrators of the Small Business Administration
Alabama Democrats